Amalia is a town in Dr Ruth Segomotsi Mompati District Municipality in the North West province of South Africa.

The town was founded in 1927 and named for Amalia Faustmann, a well-known local church figure.

References

Populated places in the Mamusa Local Municipality
Populated places established in 1927